The Type 79 radar was a British naval early-warning radar developed before World War II. It was the first radar system deployed by the Royal Navy.

The first version of this radar, Type 79X, was mounted on the RN Signal School's tender, the minesweeper , in October 1936. This equipment used a frequency of 75 MHz and a wavelength of 4 metres and its antennae were strung between the ship's masts.

Improved versions, Type 79Y, were developed the following year that used a frequency of 43 MHz (7 metres). It required separate transmitting and receiving antennas and had a power output between 15 and 20 kW. A second set was mounted on the battleship  the following month, but it was not tested until January 1939.

A more powerful version, Type 79Z, was fitted to the anti-aircraft cruiser  in September 1939 and proved to be successful enough that forty more sets were ordered with the designation of Type 79. The antennae were manually rotated, but only enough wire was provided to rotate a maximum of 400°.

Notes

Bibliography

External links
 The RN Radar and Communications Museum 

Type 79 radar
Naval radars
World War II radars
Royal Navy Radar
Military equipment introduced in the 1930s